The German foundation Berthold Leibinger Stiftung was founded in 1992 by the engineer, entrepreneur and patron Berthold Leibinger in Ditzingen near Stuttgart, Germany. The non-profit foundation is dedicated to cultural, scientific, church related and social issues. The capital stock amounts to 9.9 Millionen Euros (in 2008). Since 2000 the foundation biennially awards the international innovation prize Berthold Leibinger Innovationspreis for applied laser technology. The Berthold Leibinger Zukunftspreis (engl.: future prize) honors milestones in research on the application or generation of laser light since 2006. The Leibinger foundation supports the American Academy in Berlin Fellow's program.

References 
 Laser Focus World, Volume: 43 Issue: 9, Sept. 2007: Prize for laser innovation accepting entries
 The Grants Register 2007, 25th Edition, Macmillan Publishers Ltd.
 Maecenas Award presented to Berthold Leibinger (Laudation, in German)
 Activities described on website and brochures of the Berthold Leibinger Stiftung
 Berthold Leibinger Fellow Class of Spring 2008 on Website of American Academy in Berlin

External links 
 http://www.leibinger-stiftung.de Website of the Berthold Leibinger Stiftung
 http://www.americanacademy.de/home/fellows/ The American Academy in Berlin Fellow's program Webpage

Foundations based in Germany